Water polo at the 2022 World Aquatics Championships was held between 20 June and 3 July 2022.

Schedule
Two competitions were held.

All time are local (UTC+2).

Qualification
A total of 16 teams qualified for each tournament.

Men

Russia was excluded due to the 2022 Russian invasion of Ukraine.

Women

Russia was excluded due to the 2022 Russian invasion of Ukraine.
China and Japan withdrew before the tournament.

Medal summary

Medal table

Medalists

References

External links
Official website

 
2022
2022 World Aquatics Championships
International water polo competitions hosted by Hungary
2022 in water polo